The 1831 Connecticut gubernatorial election was held on April 8, 1831. Incumbent acting governor and National Republican nominee John S. Peters was elected to a term in his own right after the resignation of his predecessor Gideon Tomlinson, defeating Anti-Masonic nominee Zalmon Storrs with 68.75% of the vote.

As the election took place during the early Second Party System, this was the last time a candidate for the governor's office would be listed under the Federalist banner.

General election

Candidates
Major party candidates

John S. Peters, National Republican

Candidates
Minor party candidates

Zalmon Storrs, Anti-Masonic
Henry W. Edwards, Jacksonian
John T. Riley
Timothy Pitkin, Federalist

Results

References

1831
Connecticut
Gubernatorial